Clear Springs High School (CSHS) is an American public high school located in League City, Texas. It is one of seven high schools in the Clear Creek Independent School District (CCISD). The school opened in 2007 serving most of League City west of Interstate 45 and part of the Harris County portion of Friendswood.

History 
The construction of Clear Springs High School was approved by voters in the Clear Creek Independent School District during a 2004 bond election at a cost of $65,257,412.

Clear Springs High School opened for the 2007–2008 school year taking its zoning from areas previously served by Clear Creek High School and Clear Brook High School. In its initial year, Clear Springs was attended only by ninth and tenth graders, adding an additional grade level each year. The first graduating class was the Class of 2010.

Demographics 
As of the 2019–2020 school year, the demographic breakdown of the 2,815 students enrolled was as follows:

 White – 51.3%
 Hispanic – 27.0%
 Asian – 8.9%
 African American – 7.9%
 Two or More Races – 4.4%
 Native American – 0.2%
 Pacific Islander – 0.2%
 Economically Disadvantaged – 11.4%

Academics
In 2022, U.S. News & World Report ranked the school #240 in Texas and #2602 nationally based on college readiness and state exam scores.

Fine arts

Musical theatre
Clear Springs produces a full-length musical every year which is entered into the Tommy Tune Awards. The show is produced and operated across the Choir, Theatre, and Technical Theatre departments.

Band
There are three concert ensembles: the Wind Ensemble, Symphonic Band, and Concert Band.  In the fall, there is a competitive marching band and color guard.  The Wind Ensemble has twice been recognized by the national Mark of Excellence Award by the National Wind Band Honors project.

Orchestra
The Charger Orchestra is a full symphonic orchestra, in collaboration with the Charger Band Program as of the academic year of 2012-2013. There are four String groups: Chamber I, Chamber II, Symphony, and Philharmonic. For the last several years, the orchestra has received top honors with all of its groups in UIL evaluation.

Extracurricular activities

Honor societies

 National Honor Society (NHS)
 Rho Kappa (Social Studies)
 National English Honor Society (NEHS)
 Mu Alpha Theta (Mathematics)
 Science National Honor Society (SNHS)
 Sociedad Honoraria Hispánica (Spanish)
 Société Honoraire de Français (French)
 National Technical Honor Society (NTHS)
 American Sign Language Honor Society (ASLHS)
 International Thespian Society

Clubs
HOSA
DECA
Student United Way
Interact Club
Army JROTC
FFA

Feeder patterns
Clear Springs High School's approved attendance boundaries have been in effect since fall 2007.

Elementary schools
 Bauerschlag
 Campbell
 Gilmore
 Hall
 League City
 Ross
 Greene (partial)
 Landolt (partial)

Intermediate schools
 Creekside
 Brookside (Science Magnet Program, partial)
 Victory Lakes (partial)
 League City (WAVE program)
 Seabrook (Science Magnet program)

In-District Transfers:
Students living within the Clear Creek Independent School District zoning boundaries, but not within the Clear Springs High School zoning boundaries, can apply for an In-District Transfer to be able to attend Clear Springs High School. Transfers must be approved by District Officials and may be granted for the following reasons:
Transportation Conflicts
Culinary Arts Program
Engineering Program
Sports
Dance/ Drill Team
Band and Other Fine Arts
Transfers will be granted based on the individual student and can be revoked if the student presents a problem to their new campus.

Notable alumni

Sports 
 Marcus Johnson: wide receiver for the Philadelphia Eagles when they won Super Bowl LII (2018). He currently plays for the New York Giants and previously played college football for the University of Texas at Austin.
Brooke McCarty–Williams: professional basketball player for the Dallas Wings of the Women's National Basketball Association.

See also 

Clear Creek Independent School District
League City, Texas

References

External links
 Official website
 Clear Springs High School News
 Clear Creek Independent School District
 Clear Springs High School on Twitter

High schools in Galveston County, Texas
Galveston Bay Area
Clear Creek Independent School District high schools
2007 establishments in Texas
Educational institutions established in 2007